= Moeneeb Abbas =

South African cricketer (born 1983)

Personal information
- Full name: Moeneeb Abbas
- Born: 22 January 1983 (age 43); Cape Town, South Africa
- Batting: Right-handed
- Bowling: Right-arm medium

Domestic team information
- Years: Team
- 2009–2012: Western Province

Career statistics
Competition	FC	LA	T20
Matches	12	10	1
Runs scored	544	254	11
Batting average	27.20	28.22	11
100s/50s	0/6	1/0	0/0
Top score	67	111*	11
Catches/stumpings	6/–	2/–	0/–
- Source: CricketArchive (subscription required), 26 June 2016

Moeneeb Abbas (born 22 January 1983) is a South African cricketer, who played for Western Province in first-class, List A and Twenty20 cricket.
